Andon Gushterov (born 16 February 1990) is a Bulgarian footballer who plays as a forward for Bulgarian Second League club Levski Lom.

Career
On 15 March 2012, Gushterov scored the first goal for Septemvri Simitli in the historic 2–1 victory against Bulgarian powerhouse CSKA Sofia in the quarter-finals of the Bulgarian Cup. In early July 2012, he signed a two-year contract with A PFG club Montana, but was unable to establish himself as part of the first team and left the club in late November.

On 1 August 2017, Gushterov signed with CSKA 1948.

Career statistics

Club

References

External links
 
 

1990 births
Living people
Bulgarian footballers
Association football forwards
PFC Belasitsa Petrich players
PFC Slavia Sofia players
OFC Vihren Sandanski players
FC Septemvri Simitli players
FC Montana players
FC Lyubimets players
OFC Pirin Blagoevgrad players
Neftochimic Burgas players
FC CSKA 1948 Sofia players
First Professional Football League (Bulgaria) players
People from Petrich
Sportspeople from Blagoevgrad Province
21st-century Bulgarian people